USS Dynamic may refer to the following ships operated by the United States Navy:

  was launched 26 May 1942 and decommissioned 19 November 1945.
  is an auxiliary floating dry-dock, delivered to the Navy on 1 March 1944 and currently on active service.

United States Navy ship names